Suzzy Dede Teye (born 6 November 2002) is a Ghanaian footballer, who plays as a  midfielder for Hatayspor in the Turkish Super League and the Ghana women's national team.

Club career 
Teye played for the Ghana Women's Premier League club Lady Strikers F.C.. In 2021, she was named "Player of the Month February".

In October 2022, she moved to Turkey, and signed with Hatayspor to play in the 2022–23 Sper League.

International career 
Teye was admitted to the Ghana girls' U-17 team  to plat at the [[2018 African U-17 Women's World Cup Qualifying Tournament and the  2018 FIFA U-17 Women's World Cup .

She was a member of the Ghana women's U-20 team at the  2022 FIFA U-20 Women's World Cup.

She is part of the Ghana women's national team.

Honours

Individual 
 Player of the Month: ,(2021 February) Lady Strikers F.C.

References 

2002 births
Living people
Women's association football midfielders
Ghanaian women's footballers
Ghana women's international footballers
Ghanaian expatriate women's footballers
Expatriate women's footballers in Turkey
Ghanaian expatriate sportspeople in Turkey
Turkish Women's Football Super League players
Hatayspor (women's football) players